Nicholas Peter Gilbert Ross (born 2 October 1947) is a Scottish former first-class cricketer.

Ross was born at Edinburgh in October 1947. He was educated at Marlborough College, before going up to Selwyn College, Cambridge. While studying at Cambridge, he made his debut in first-class cricket for Cambridge University against Essex at Fenner's in 1969. He played seven further first-class matches for Cambridge, the last coming in 1970. In his eight first-class matches for Cambridge, he scored 224 runs at an average of 28.00 and a high score of 68. With his leg break googly bowling, he took 9 wickets with best figures of 2 for 22. In addition to playing first-class cricket, he also played minor counties cricket for Cambridgeshire in 1979, making three appearances in the Minor Counties Championship.

References

External links

1947 births
Living people
Cricketers from Edinburgh
People educated at Marlborough College
Alumni of Selwyn College, Cambridge
Scottish cricketers
Cambridge University cricketers
Cambridgeshire cricketers